Los Veteranos II is a census-designated place (CDP) in Webb County, Texas, United States. This was a new CDP formed from parts of the Botines CDP prior to the 2010 census. The population was 11 at the 2020 census.

It is one of several colonias in the county.

Geography
Los Veteranos II is located at  (27.771135, -99.443309).

Education
Residents are in the United Independent School District. Zoned schools include: San Isidro Elementary School, Elias Herrera Middle School, United High School.

The designated community college for Webb County is Laredo Community College.

References

Census-designated places in Webb County, Texas
Census-designated places in Texas